Gary Drinnon (born June 11, 1950) is an American weightlifter. He competed in the men's heavyweight event at the 1976 Summer Olympics.

References

External links
 

1950 births
Living people
American male weightlifters
Olympic weightlifters of the United States
Weightlifters at the 1976 Summer Olympics
Sportspeople from Chattanooga, Tennessee
20th-century American people
21st-century American people